Adrian Kondratiuk (born 23 February 1993) is a Polish handball player for Wybrzeże Gdańsk and the Polish national team.

He represented Poland at the 2020 European Men's Handball Championship.

References

External links

1993 births
Living people
Polish male handball players
People from Legnica